Karunamayudu is a 1978 Indian Telugu-language biographical film written and directed by A. Bhimsingh. It stars Vijayachander as Jesus of Nazareth. The film won two Nandi Awards, was notable for two song sequences narrating the Birth of Jesus and Entry into Jerusalem, the film was screened at the International Film Festival of India.

It was followed by Dayamayudu (1987), starring  Vijayachander as Saint Paul, which can considered as a sequel to Karunamayudu. A television series titled Dayasagar (after the Hindi title of the film) aired on DD National, the national public broadcaster, in the 1990s with Vijayachander reprising the role of Jesus Christ.

Role in Evangelism in India
Directed and produced in India, with all-Indian actors, Karunamayudu was seen by many missionaries as one of the most culturally relevant tools for Christian evangelism in India. In India, many of the villagers encounter a story that they are unfamiliar with: the Life of Christ. The gospel is rendered in their cultural context when the film is shown.

Cast

 Vijayachander as Jesus
 Vennira Aadai Nirmala as Mary Magdalene
 A. Bhimsingh as Judas Iscariot
 Chandra Mohan as Bartimaeus, the Blind man
 Jaggayya as Pontius Pilate
 Surekha as Mary
 Rajasulochana
 Sumalatha
 Mukkamala
 Mikkilineni
 Dhulipala
 Raja Babu
 Padmanabham
 Giri Babu as Apostle John
 Sreedhar
 Tyagaraju
 Mada Venkateswara Rao

Other language titles
 Hindi - Daya Sagar
 Tamil - Karunamoorthy
 English - Ocean of Mercy
 Kannada - Dayasagara
 Malayalam - Mishihaacharithram

Songs
Playback Singers: S. P. Balasubrahmanyam, Vani Jayaram, V. Ramakrishna
 "Devudu Ledani Anakunda" (Singer: S. P. Balasubrahmanyam)
 "Kadile Muvvala Sandadilo" (Singer: Vani Jayaram)
 "Kadilindi Karuna Radham" (Singer: S. P. Balasubrahmanyam)
 "Paripoorna Kreestu"
 "Puvvulakanna Punnami Vennelakanna" (Singer: V. Ramakrishna)

Awards
Nandi Awards
 Third Best Feature Film - Bronze - Vijayachander
 Best Screenplay Writer - Modhukuri Jhonson

References

External links
  Dayasagar Website
 
 
 
 Actor Vijayachander interview explaining history, making of movie 'Karunamayudu'

1978 films
1970s Telugu-language films
Films directed by A. Bhimsingh
Film portrayals of Jesus' death and resurrection
Films about Jesus
Films set in Palestine (region)
Films set in Jerusalem
Films set in ancient Egypt
Films set in the Roman Empire
Films set in the 1st century
Films shot in India
Portrayals of the Virgin Mary in film
Religious epic films
Portrayals of Mary Magdalene in film
Films based on the Bible
Film series based on the Bible
Films based on the New Testament
Films based on the Gospels
Films about Christianity
Films about the Nativity of Jesus
Depictions of Herod the Great on film
The Devil in film
Cultural depictions of Judas Iscariot
Cultural depictions of John the Baptist
Cultural depictions of the Biblical Magi
Cultural depictions of Paul the Apostle
Cultural depictions of Saint Peter
Cultural depictions of Pontius Pilate
John the Apostle
Thomas the Apostle
Portrayals of Saint Joseph in film
Christian mass media in India